"Pink Shoe Laces" (or "Pink Shoelaces") is a song composed by Mickie Grant that was recorded by Dodie Stevens, accompanied by Bobby Hammack and his Orchestra, and released as a single in 1959 on Crystalette Records, a record label distributed by Dot Records. Although the verses are delivered with a musical quality, they are not sung in the style of the chorus.  Some commentators have observed that the verses are spoken rather than sung.

Recording 
Dodie Stevens was born on February 17, 1946. The song was recorded when the singer was, according to different sources, 11 or 12 years old.

Content 

The song is about a fellow named Dooley, with whom the singer is in love, who has a strange lifestyle and an off-the-beaten-pathway fashion sense; primarily preferring to dress in "tan shoes with pink shoelaces, a polka-dot vest (...) and a big Panama with a purple hatband." 

He takes the young lady "deep sea fishing in a submarine", to "drive-in movies in a limousine" and owns a "whirly-birdy and a 12 foot yacht." 

When he feels that war is afoot, he enlists in the armed forces, but gets put into the brig for "raising such a storm" when they "tried to put him in a uniform", preferring to wear his unconventional signature garb. 

One day, he feels poorly and decides to write out his will, stating: "Just before the angels come to carry me, I want it down in writin' how to bury me", requesting to be buried in his preferred attire. The voice heard speaking the line was Randy Van Horne, the founder of the Randy Van Horne Singers who sang the themes from the Flintstones, Jetsons and many others.

Chart performance
The single reached number 3 on the Billboard Hot 100 in April 1959. "Pink Shoe Laces" also reached number 5 on the Hot R&B Sides chart. It sold more than a million copies.

Track listing 
Side A. "Pink Shoe Laces"
Side B. "Coming of Age"

Cover versions 
The Chordettes' rendition has them speaking and singing all of the lyrics, except for Dooley's Will, which is spoken by a male voice.
In 1959, Roberta Shore  along with the backup of The Lennon Sisters, sang a cover of the song on The Lawrence Welk Show. This version is unique as it is not only sung as a solo from Roberta Shore, but also has sections of a harmony trio from the Lennon sisters. It also noted that the person playing Dooley in this version was played by Rocky Rockwell.
In 1960, Mexican rock and roll group Los Hooligans recorded a Spanish-language take titled "Agujetas de color de rosa". Their version was highly popular in Mexico, topping the charts for 9 weeks in 1961, and became one of the first rock and roll hits in that country.
And In LittleBigPlanet 3 It Plays In The Level Named: Shake Rattle And Roll

References

External links 
 
 
 

1959 singles
1959 songs